Louis Gauffier (1762–1801) was a French painter.  Born in Poitiers, he studied in Paris with the history painter Hughes Taraval before entering the Prix de Rome competition which he won in 1779 for Christ and the Woman of Canaan. Apart from a brief return to Paris in 1789 he remained in Italy for the remainder of his life.

In March 1790, he married his pupil Pauline Chatillon, who was herself a well-known painter. They had two children, one of whom became the Italian miniaturist painter Faustina Malfatti (1792-1837).

Gauffier initially settled in Rome, but popular unrest following the execution of Louis XVI led him to flee with his wife to Florence. He could not receive patronage from France because he was branded a royalist, and this curtailed his career as a history painter. Instead, he painted landscapes, which he sold to English tourists. When French troops occupied Florence in 1799, he began to paint officers' portraits.

Gauffier died in Livorno (Tuscany) in 1801.

An exhibition devoted to his work opened in Montpellier in May 2022 to run until September. It is scheduled for Poitiers in October 2022 to February 2023.

Works

References

Additional sources 
Philip Conisbee, Sarah Faunce, and Jeremy Strick. In the Light of Italy: Corot and Early Open-Air Painting. New Haven; Yale University Press, 1996.

18th-century French painters
French male painters
1762 births
1801 deaths
18th-century French male artists